Andes is a municipality and town in the Antioquia Department, Colombia. Part of the subregion of Southwestern Antioquia.  It is located on the western Colombian Andes mountain range.  Andes was founded on 13 March 1852 by Pedro Antonio Restrepo Escobar. Its elevation is 1.360 masl with an average temperature of 22 °C.  The distance reference from Medellín city, the capital of Antioquia Department, is 117 km and it has a total area of 403.42 km2.  This town is well known for being the place where Gonzalo Arango a writer, philosopher and Antioquian journalist was born.  The more significantly source of its economy is agriculture, mainly coffee cultivation.

Municipalities of Antioquia Department
Populated places established in 1852
1852 establishments in the Republic of New Granada